Shashemene City (aka Shashemene Kenema) is an Ethiopian football club, in the city of Shashemene, Misraq Shewa Zone, Oromia Region.  They play in the Ethiopian Premier League, the top level of professional football in Ethiopia.

References

Football clubs in Ethiopia